This is a list of scientific phenomena and concepts named after people (eponymous phenomena). For other lists of eponyms, see eponym.

A
 Abderhalden–Fauser reaction – Emil Abderhalden and August Fauser (1856–1938)
 Abney effect – William de Wiveleslie Abney
 Abrikosov lattice – Alexei Alexeyevich Abrikosov
 Aharonov–Bohm effect – Yakir Aharonov and David Bohm
 Alfvén wave – Hannes Olof Gösta Alfvén
 Alhazen's problem – Alhazen
 Allais effect – Maurice Allais
 Allee effect – Warder Clyde Allee
 Amdahl's law, a.k.a. Amdahl's argument – Gene Amdahl
 Ampère's law – André-Marie Ampère
 Anderson–Higgs mechanism (a.k.a. Higgs mechanism) – Peter Higgs and Philip Warren Anderson
 Anderson–Darling test – Theodore Wilbur Anderson and Donald A. Darling
 Andreev reflection – Alexander F. Andreev
 Apgar score – Virginia Apgar
 Arago spot – Dominique François Jean Arago
 Michaelis–Arbuzov reaction – Aleksandr Erminingeldovich Arbuzov and August Karl Arnold Michaelis
 Archimedean spiral, Archimedes number – Archimedes
 Argand diagram – Jean Robert Argand
 Aristotle's lantern – Aristotle
 Armstrong oscillator – Edwin Armstrong
 Arndt–Eistert synthesis – Fritz Arndt and Bernd Eistert
 Arndt–Schulz law/principle/rule – Rudolf Arndt and Hugo Paul Friedrich Schulz
 Arrhenius equation – Svante August Arrhenius
 Ashkin–Teller model (a.k.a. Potts model) – Julius Ashkin and Edward Teller
 Asinger reaction – Friedrich Asinger
 Auger effect (a.k.a. Auger-Meitner effect), electron – Pierre Victor Auger and Lise Meitner
 Autler–Townes effect – Stanley H. Autler and Charles H. Townes
 Auwers synthesis – Karl von Auwers
 Avogadro's law, Avogadro constant, Avogadro number – Count Lorenzo Romano Amedeo Carlo Avogadro di Quaregna e Cerreto

B
 Baeyer–Drewson indigo synthesis – Johann Friedrich Wilhelm Adolf von Baeyer and Viggo Drewsen
 Baeyer–Villiger oxidation and Baeyer–Villiger rearrangement – Johann Friedrich Wilhelm Adolf von Baeyer and Victor Villiger
 Babler–Dauben oxidation – James Babler and William Garfield Dauben
 Bagnold number – Ralph Alger Bagnold
 Baily's beads – Francis Baily
 Baker–Nathan effect – John William Baker and Wilfred S. Nathan
 Bakerian mimicry – Herbert G. Baker
 Baldwin effect (astronomy) – Jack Allen Baldwin
 Baldwin effect (Baldwinian evolution, Ontogenic evolution) – James Mark Baldwin
 Baldwin's rules – Jack Edward Baldwin
 Balmer line, series – Johann Jakob Balmer
 Bamberger rearrangement – Eugen Bamberger
 Bamford–Stevens reaction – William Randall Bamford and Thomas Stevens Stevens
 Barkhausen effect – Heinrich Barkhausen
 Barnett effect – Samuel Jackson Barnett
 Barnum effect (a.k.a. Forer effect) – Phineas Taylor Barnum (and Bertram R. Forer)
 Barton reaction – Derek Harold Richard Barton
 Barton–McCombie deoxygenation – Derek Harold Richard Barton and Stuart W. McCombie
 Baskerville effect – the fictional Charles Baskerville of the novel The Hound of the Baskervilles
 Batesian mimicry – Henry Walter Bates
 Bayes's theorem – Thomas Bayes
 Baylis–Hillman reaction – Anthony B. Baylis and Melville E. D. Hillman
 Bayliss effect – William M. Bayliss
 BCS superconduction theory – John Bardeen, Leon Cooper, and Robert Schrieffer
 Beaufort scale (Beaufort wind force scale) – Francis Beaufort
 Beckmann rearrangement – Ernst Otto Beckmann
 Beer's law (a.k.a. Beer–Lambert law or Beer–Lambert–Bouguer law) – August Beer (and Johann Heinrich Lambert and Pierre Bouguer)
 Beilstein's test – Friedrich Konrad Beilstein
 Bejan number – Adrian Bejan
 Bekenstein bound – Jacob Bekenstein
 Bélády's anomaly – László Bélády
 Bell's inequality – John Stewart Bell
 Bell number – Eric Temple Bell
 Belousov–Zhabotinskii reaction – Boris Pavlovich Belousov and Anatol Markovich Zhabotinskii
 Bénard cell – Henri Bénard
 Bénard–Marangoni cell/convection (a.k.a. Marangoni convection) – Henri Bénard and Carlo Marangoni
 Benedict's test – Stanley Rossiter Benedict
 Benford's law – Frank Albert Benford, Jr.
 Benioff zone – see Wadati–Benioff zone, below
 Bennett pinch – Willard Harrison Bennett
 Berezinsky–Kosterlitz–Thouless transition – Veniamin L. Berezinsky, John M. Kosterlitz, and David J. Thouless
 Bergman cyclization – Robert George Bergman
 Bergmann's rule – Carl Bergmann (anatomist)
 Bergmann–Zervas carbobenzoxy method – Max Bergmann and Leonidas Zervas
 Bernoulli effect, Bernoulli's equation, principle – Daniel Bernoulli
 Berry's phase – Michael V. Berry
 Betz limit – Albert Betz
 Bezold–Brücke shift (a.k.a. von Bezold spreading effect) – Johann Friedrich Wilhelm von Bezold and Ernst Wilhelm von Brücke
 Biefeld–Brown effect – Paul Alfred Biefeld and Thomas Townsend Brown
 Biginelli reaction – Pietro Biginelli
 Biot number – Jean-Baptiste Biot
 Biot–Savart law – Jean-Baptiste Biot and Félix Savart
 Birch reduction – Arthur John Birch
 Birkeland currents – Kristian Birkeland
 Bischler–Napieralski reaction – August Bischler and Bernard Napieralski
 Black's equation for electromigration – James R. Black (d. 2004) of Motorola
 Blandford–Znajek process – Roger D. Blandford and Roman L. Znajek
 Blasius boundary layer, flow – Paul Richard Heinrich Blasius
 Blazhko effect – Sergey Blazhko
 Bloch electrons – Felix Bloch
 Bloom filter – Burton Howard Bloom
 Bodenstein number – Max Bodenstein
 Bohm sheath criterion – David Bohm
 Bohr effect – Christian Bohr
 Bohr magneton, model, radius – Niels Bohr
 Boltzmann constant – Ludwig Boltzmann
 Bonnor–Ebert mass – William Bowen Bonnor and Rolf Ebert
 Borel algebra, measure, set, space, summation, Borel's lemma, paradox – Émile Borel
 Borel–Cantelli lemma – Émile Borel and Francesco Paolo Cantelli
 Borel–Carathéodory theorem – Émile Borel and Constantin Carathéodory
 Born–Haber cycle – Max Born and Fritz Haber
 Born–Oppenheimer approximation – Max Born and Robert Oppenheimer
 Borodin–Hunsdiecker reaction – Alexander Borodin, Hienz Hunsdiecker, and Clare Hunsdiecker (née Dieckmann)
 Borrmann effect (a.k.a. Borrmann–Campbell effect) – Gerhard Borrman (and Herbert N. Campbell)
 Bortle scale – John E. Bortle
 Bose–Einstein condensate, effect, statistics – Satyendra Nath Bose and Albert Einstein
 Boson – Satyendra Nath Bose
 Boyer's law – Carl Benjamin Boyer
 Boyle's law (a.k.a. Boyle–Mariotte law) – Robert Boyle (and Edme Mariotte)
 Brackett line/series – Frederick Sumner Brackett
 Bradford's law (of scattering) – Samuel C. Bradford
 Braess's paradox – Dietrich Braess
 Bragg angle, Bragg's law, Bragg plane – William Henry Bragg and his son William Lawrence Bragg
 Bragg diffraction – William Lawrence Bragg
 Brans–Dicke theory – Carl H. Brans and Robert H. Dicke
 Bravais lattice – Auguste Bravais
 Bravais–Miller indices (a.k.a. Miller–Bravais indices) – Auguste Bravais and William Hallowes Miller
 Brayton cycle – George B. Brayton
 Bredt's rule – Julius Bredt
 Brewster's angle, law – David Brewster
 Brillouin zone – Léon Brillouin
 Brinkman number – Hendrik C. Brinkman
 Brook rearrangement – Adrian Gibbs Brook
 Brooks's law (of software development) – Frederick Phillips Brooks, Jr.
 Brownian motion – Robert Brown
 Bucherer reaction – Hans Theodor Bucherer
 Büchi automata – Julius Richard Büchi
 Buckingham π theorem – Edgar Buckingham
 Burali-Forti paradox – Cesare Burali-Forti
 Bürgi–Dunitz angle – Hans-Beat Bürgi and Jack David Dunitz

C
 Cabannes–Daure effect – Jean Cabannes and Pierre Daure
 Cadiot–Chodkiewicz coupling, reaction – Paul Cadiot and Wladyslav Chodkiewicz
 Callendar effect – Guy Stewart Callendar
 Callippic cycle – Callippus of Cyzicus
 Calvin cycle (a.k.a. Calvin–Benson cycle) – Melvin Calvin (and Andy Benson)
 Cannizzaro reaction – Stanislao Cannizzaro
 Cardan angles (a.k.a. Tait–Bryan angles) – Gerolamo Cardano
 Carnot cycle, number – Nicolas Léonard Sadi Carnot
 Carpenter effect (a.k.a. Ideomotor effect) – William Benjamin Carpenter
 Cartan–Kähler theorem – Élie Cartan, Erich Kähler
 Casimir effect – Hendrik Casimir
 Catalan's conjecture (a.k.a. Mihăilescu's theorem), Catalan numbers – Eugène Charles Catalan
 Cauchy number (a.k.a. Hooke number) – Augustin-Louis Cauchy
 Cauchy–Kovalevskaya theorem – Augustin-Louis Cauchy, Sofia Kovalevskaya
 Cauer filter – Wilhelm Cauer
 Chandler wobble – Seth Carlo Chandler
 Chandrasekhar limit, number – Subrahmanyan Chandrasekhar
 Chang–Refsdal lens – Kyongae Chang and Sjur Refsdal
 Chaplygin gas – Sergey Alexeyevich Chaplygin
 Charles's law – Jacques Charles
 Chebyshev distance, equation, filter, linkage, polynomials – Pafnuty Chebyshev
 Chebyshev's inequality (a.k.a. Bienaymé–Chebyshev inequality) – Pafnuty Chebyshev (and Irénée-Jules Bienaymé)
 Cherenkov radiation (a.k.a. Cherenkov–Vavilov radiation) – Pavel Alekseyevich Cherenkov (and Sergey Ivanovich Vavilov)
 Chichibabin reaction – Alexei Yevgenievich Chichibabin
 Christiansen effect – Christian Christiansen
 Christoffel symbol – Elwin Bruno Christoffel
 Christofilos effect – Nicholas Christofilos
 Chugaev elimination/reaction, reagent – Lev Aleksandrovich Chugaev
 Chwolson ring or Chwolson–Einstein ring – Orest Khvolson (and Albert Einstein)
 Clairaut's relation, theorem – Alexis Claude Clairaut
 Claisen condensation, rearrangement – Rainer Ludwig Claisen
 Claisen–Schmidt condensation – Rainer Ludwig Claisen and J. Gustav Schmidt
 Clapp oscillator – James K. Clapp
 Clarke orbit – Arthur C. Clarke
 Clemmensen reduction – Erik Christian Clemmensen
 Coanda effect – Henri Coanda
 Coase theorem – Ronald Coase
 Colburn–Chilton analogy (a.k.a. Colburn analogy) – Allan Philip Colburn and Thomas H. Chilton
 Coleman–Liau index – Meri Coleman and T. L. Liau
 Coleman–Mandula theorem – Sidney Coleman and Jeffrey Mandula
 Collatz conjecture (a.k.a. the Ulam conjecture (Stanisław Ulam), Kakutani's problem (Shizuo Kakutani), the Thwaites conjecture (Sir Bryan Thwaites), Hasse's algorithm (Helmut Hasse), the Syracuse problem) – Lothar Collatz
 Colpitts oscillator – Edwin H. Colpitts
 Compton effect, scattering, wavelength – Arthur Compton
 Compton–Getting effect – Arthur Compton and Ivan A. Getting
 Conway base 13 function – John H. Conway
 Coolidge effect – from a joke attributed to John Calvin Coolidge, Jr.
 Cooper pair – Leon Cooper
 Cope elimination, rearrangement – Arthur Clay Cope
 Corey–Fuchs reaction – Elias James Corey and Philip L. Fuchs
 Corey–Kim oxidation – Elias James Corey and Choung Un Kim
 Corey–Winter olefin synthesis – Elias James Corey and Roland Arthur Edwin Winter
 Coriolis effect – Gaspard-Gustave Coriolis
 Cotton effect – Aimé Auguste Cotton
 Cotton–Mouton effect – Aimé Auguste Cotton and Henri Mouton
 Coulomb constant, law – Charles Augustin de Coulomb
 Coulter counter, principle – Wallace Henry Coulter
 Coxeter–Dynkin diagram – Harold Scott MacDonald Coxeter and Eugene Borisovich Dynkin
 Crabtree effect – Herbert Grace Crabtree
 Criegee reaction, rearrangement – Rudolf Criegee
 Curie point – Pierre Curie
 Curry's paradox – Haskell Curry
 Curtin–Hammett principle – David Yarrow Curtin and Louis Plack Hammett
 Curtius rearrangement – Theodor Curtius

D
 Dakin reaction – Henry Drysdale Dakin
 Dakin–West reaction – Henry Drysdale Dakin and Randolph West
 Dalton's law (of partial pressures) – John Dalton
 Damerau–Levenshtein distance – Frederick J. Damerau and Vladimir Levenshtein
 Darboux function – Jean Gaston Darboux
 Darcy's law – Henry Darcy
 Darlington pair – Sidney Darlington
 Darwin drift – Charles Galton Darwin
 Darwin point, Darwinism – Charles Darwin
 Darzens condensation – Auguste Georges Darzens
 Davies–Bouldin index (DBI) – David L. Davies and Donald W. Bouldin
 de Broglie wavelength – Louis de Broglie
 de Bruijn sequences – Nicolaas Govert de Bruijn
 de Haas–van Alphen effect – Wander Johannes de Haas and Pieter M. van Alphen
 de Haas–Shubnikov effect – see Shubnikov–de Haas effect, below
 Deborah number – the prophetess Deborah (Bible, Judges 5:5)
 Debye model – Peter Joseph William Debye
 Debye–Falkenhagen effect – Peter Joseph William Debye and Hans Falkenhagen
 Richard Dedekind has many topics named after him; see biography article.
 Delbrück scattering – Max Ludwig Henning Delbrück
 Delépine reaction – Stéphane Marcel Delépine
 Dellinger effect (a.k.a. Mögel–Dellinger effect) – John Howard Dellinger (and Hans Mögel)
 Demjanov rearrangement – Nikolai Jakovlevich Demjanov
 Dermott's law – Stanley Dermott
 Dess–Martin oxidation – Daniel Benjamin Dess and James Cullen Martin
 DeVries solar cycle – See Suess solar cycle, below
 Dice's coefficient – Lee Raymond Dice
 Dieckmann condensation – Walter Dieckmann
 Diels–Alder reaction – Otto Paul Hermann Diels and Kurt Alder
 Diophantine equation – Diophantus of Alexandria
 Dirac comb, fermion, spinor, equation, delta function, measure – Paul Dirac
 Peter Gustav Lejeune Dirichlet has dozens of formulas named after him, see List of things named after Peter Gustav Lejeune Dirichlet
 Divisia index – François Divisia
 Doebner–Miller reaction – Oscar Döbner (Doebner) and Wilhelm von Miller
 Dollo's law – Louis Dollo
 Donnan effect (a.k.a. Gibbs–Donnan effect) – see Gibbs–Donnan effect, below
 Doppler effect (a.k.a. Doppler–Fizeau effect), Doppler profile – Christian Doppler (and Hippolyte Fizeau)
 Downs–Thomson paradox – Anthony Downs and John Michael Thomson
 Drake equation (a.k.a. Sagan equation, Green Bank equation) – Frank Drake (or Carl Sagan or Green Bank, West Virginia, home to the National Radio Astronomy Observatory (NRAO))
 Droste effect – Dutch chocolate maker Droste
 Drude model – Paul Drude
 Duff's device – Tom Duff
 Duffing equation, map – Georg Duffing
 Duhamel's integral, and principle – Jean-Marie Constant Duhamel
 Dulong–Petit law – Pierre Louis Dulong and Alexis Thérèse Petit
 Dunitz angle – see Bürgi–Dunitz angle, above
 Dunning–Kruger effect – David Dunning and Justin Kruger
 Dyson–Harrop satellite – Brooks L. Harrop and Freeman Dyson

E
 Early effect – James M. Early
 Eddington limit – Arthur Eddington
 Edgeworth–Bowley box – Francis Ysidro Edgeworth and Arthur Lyon Bowley
 Edison effect – Thomas Edison
 Edman degradation – Pehr Victor Edman
 Edward–Lemieux effect (a.k.a. Anomeric effect) – John Thomas Edward and Raymond U. Lemieux
 Eglinton reaction – Geoffrey Eglinton
 Ehrenfest paradox – Paul Ehrenfest
 Eimer's organ – Gustav Heinrich Theodor Eimer
 Einstein Cross, effect, radius, ring, shift – Albert Einstein
 Einstein–Chwolson ring or Chwolson ring – Albert Einstein and Orest Khvolson
 Einstein–de Haas effect – Albert Einstein and Wander Johannes de Haas
 Einstein–Podolsky–Rosen paradox (a.k.a. EPR paradox, Einstein–Podolsky–Rosen–Bohm paradox) – Albert Einstein, Boris Podolsky, Nathan Rosen (and David Bohm)
 Ekman layer – Walfrid Ekman
 Elbs reaction – Karl Elbs
 Elliott–Halberstam conjecture – Peter D. T. A. Elliott and Heini Halberstam
 Elman network – Jeff Elman
 Elsasser number – Walter M. Elsasser
 Engel curve – Ernst Engel
 Engelbart's law – Douglas Engelbart
 Epimenides paradox – Epimenides of Knossos
 Erlenmeyer flask, rule, synthesis – Richard August Carl Emil Erlenmeyer
 Eschenmoser fragmentation – Albert Eschenmoser
 Eschweiler–Clarke reaction – Wilhelm Eschweiler and Hans Thacher Clarke
 Eshelby's inclusion – John D. Eshelby
 Étard reaction – Alexandre Léon Étard
 Ettingshausen effect – Albert von Ettingshausen
 Euler this and that (numerous entries) – Leonhard Euler
 Evershed effect – John Evershed

F
 Faà di Bruno's formula – Francesco Faà di Bruno
 Faraday constant, effect, Faraday's law of induction, Faraday's law of electrolysis – Michael Faraday
 Farnsworth–Hirsch fusor – Philo T. Farnsworth and Robert L. Hirsch
 Favorskii reaction, rearrangement – Alexei Yevgrafovich Favorskii
 Fenton reaction – Henry John Horstman Fenton
 Fermat's principle – Pierre de Fermat
 Fermi energy, paradox, surface, Fermion – Enrico Fermi
 Fermi–Dirac statistics – Enrico Fermi and Paul Dirac
 Ferrel cell – William Ferrel
 Ferrers diagram (a.k.a. Young diagram, Ferrers graph) – Norman Macleod Ferrers
 Feshbach resonance – Herman Feshbach
 Feynman diagram – Richard Feynman
 Finkelstein reaction – Hans Finkelstein
 Fischer esterification, indole synthesis – Emil Hermann Fischer
 Fischer–Hafner reaction – Ernst Otto Fischer and Walter Hafner
 Fischer–Tropsch process – Franz Joseph Emil Fischer and Hans Tropsch
 Fischer–Hepp rearrangement – Otto Philipp Fischer and Eduard Hepp
 Fisher distribution – Ronald A. Fisher
 Fisher equation – Irving Fisher
 Fisher–Widom line – Michael E. Fisher and Benjamin Widom
 Fitts's law – Paul M. Fitts
 Flesch–Kincaid readability test – Rudolf F. Flesch and J. Peter Kincaid
 Fletcher–Munson curves – Harvey Fletcher and Wilden A. Munson
 Flynn effect – Jim Flynn
 Forbush effect – Scott Ellsworth Forbush
 Forer effect (a.k.a. Barnum effect) – Bertram R. Forer (and Phineas Taylor Barnum)
 Foucault pendulum – Jean Bernard Léon Foucault
 Fourier number – Joseph Fourier
 Fourier series – Joseph Fourier
 Fourier–Motzkin elimination – Joseph Fourier and Theodore Motzkin
 Franck–Condon principle – James Franck and Edward Uhler Condon
 Franssen effect – Nico Franssen
 Franz–Keldysh effect – Walter Franz and Leonid V. Keldysh
 Fraunhofer diffraction, lines – Joseph von Fraunhofer
 Freeman law – Ken Freeman
 Frenkel line – Jacov Frenkel
 Fresnel zone – Augustin Fresnel
 Frey effect – Allan H. Frey
 Friedel oscillations – Jacques Friedel
 Friedel–Crafts reaction – Charles Friedel and James Mason Crafts
 Friedländer synthesis – Paul Friedländer
 Friedmann–Lemaître–Robertson–Walker metric (a.k.a. Friedmann–Robertson–Walker metric, Robertson–Walker metric) – Alexander Friedmann, Georges Lemaître, Howard P. Robertson and Arthur Geoffrey Walker
 Fries and photo-Fries rearrangement – Karl Theophil Fries
 Fritsch–Buttenberg–Wiechell rearrangement – Paul Ernst Moritz Fritsch, Wilhelm Paul Buttenberg, and Heinrich G. Wiechell
 Frobenius algebra, automorphism, method, norm, theorem – Ferdinand Georg Frobenius
 Froude number – William Froude
 Fry readability formula – Edward Fry
 Fujita scale (a.k.a. F-Scale, Fujita–Pearson scale) – Tetsuya Theodore Fujita (and Allen Pearson)
 Fujiwhara effect – Sakuhei Fujiwhara

G
 Gabriel synthesis – Siegmund Gabriel
 Gardner transition – Elizabeth Gardner
 Garman limit – Elspeth Garman
 Gattermann reaction – Ludwig Gattermann
 Gattermann–Koch reaction – Ludwig Gattermann and Julius Arnold Koch
 Gaunt factor (or Kramers–Gaunt factor) – John Arthur Gaunt (and Hendrik Anthony Kramers)
 Gause's principle – Georgii Gause
 Gauss's law – Carl Friedrich Gauss
 Gauss–Bonnet gravity, theorem – Carl Friedrich Gauss and Pierre Ossian Bonnet
 Geib–Spevack process (a.k.a. Girdler sulfide (GS) process) – Karl-Hermann Geib and Jerome S. Spevack (and the Girdler company, which built the first American plant using the process)
 Geiger counter (a.k.a. Geiger–Müller counter) – Johannes Wilhelm (Hans) Geiger (and Walther Müller)
 Geiger–Marsden experiment (a.k.a. Rutherford experiment) – Johannes Wilhelm (Hans) Geiger and Ernest Marsden
 Geiger–Müller tube – Johannes Wilhelm (Hans) Geiger and Walther Müller
 Geiger–Nuttall law/rule – Johannes Wilhelm (Hans) Geiger and John Mitchell Nuttall
 Geissler tube – Heinrich Geissler
 Gibbs entropy, free energy, paradox, Gibbs's phase rule, Gibbs phenomenon – Josiah Willard Gibbs
 Gibbs–Donnan effect (a.k.a. Donnan effect) – Josiah Willard Gibbs and Frederick G. Donnan
 Gibbs–Marangoni effect (a.k.a. Marangoni effect) – Josiah Willard Gibbs and Carlo Marangoni
 Gibbs–Helmholtz equation – Josiah Willard Gibbs and Hermann von Helmholtz
 Gibbs–Thomson effect – Josiah Willard Gibbs and three Thomsons: James Thomson, William Thomson, 1st Baron Kelvin, Joseph John "J. J." Thomson
 Giffen good – Robert Giffen
 Gleissberg solar cycle – Wolfgang Gleißberg
 Gloger's rule – Constantin Wilhelm Lambert Gloger
 Goldbach's conjecture – Christian Goldbach
 Goldstone boson (a.k.a. Nambu–Goldstone boson) – see Nambu–Goldstone boson, below
 Gomberg–Bachmann reaction – Moses Gomberg and Werner Emmanuel Bachmann
 Goodhart's law – Charles Goodhart
 Goos–Hänchen effect or shift – Fritz Goos and Hilda Hänchen
 Gould Belt – Benjamin Gould
 Grashof number – Franz Grashof
 Greisen–Zatsepin–Kuzmin cut-off/limit (a.k.a. GZK cutoff/limit) – Kenneth Greisen, Georgiy Zatsepin and Vadim Kuzmin
 Gresham's law – Thomas Gresham
 Griess test (diazotization reaction) – Johann Peter Griess
 Grignard reaction – François Auguste Victor Grignard
 Grob fragmentation – Cyril A. Grob
 Gromov–Witten invariant – Mikhail Gromov and Edward Witten
 Grosch's law – Herbert Reuben John Grosch
 Grotrian diagram – Walter Robert Wilhelm Grotrian
 Grotthuss chain – Christian Johann Dietrich Theodor von Grotthuss
 Grotthuss–Draper law – Christian Johann Dietrich Theodor von Grotthuss and John William Draper
 Gunn diode, effect – John Battiscombe "J. B." Gunn
 Gunning fog index – Robert Gunning
 Gustafson's law, a.k.a. Gustafson–Barsis's law – John L. Gustafson (and Edward H. Barsis)
 Gutenberg–Richter law – Beno Gutenberg and Charles Francis Richter

H
 Haar measure – Alfréd Haar
 Hadamard inequality – Jacques Solomon Hadamard
 Hadamard transform (a.k.a. Hadamard–Rademacher–Walsh transform) – Jacques Hadamard, Hans Rademacher, and Joseph L. Walsh
 Hadley cell – George Hadley
 Hagedorn temperature – Rolf Hagedorn
 Haitz's law – Roland Haitz
 Haldane effect – John Scott Haldane
 Haldane's principle – John Burdon Sanderson Haldane
 Hale solar cycle – George Ellery Hale
 Hall effect – Edwin Hall
 Hamilton's rule – William Donald "Bill" Hamilton
 Hamming code, Hamming distance, Hamming weight – Richard Hamming
 Hammond postulate – George Simms Hammond
 Hanle effect – Wilhelm Hanle
 Hardy notation, space – Godfrey Harold Hardy
 Hardy–Littlewood circle method, first conjecture – Godfrey Harold Hardy and John E. Littlewood
 Hardy–Weinberg principle – Wilhelm Weinberg and Godfrey Harold Hardy
 Harrod–Johnson diagram – Roy F. Harrod and Harry G. Johnson
 Hartley oscillator – Ralph Hartley
 Hartman effect – Thomas E. Hartman
 Hartmann mask (or hat) – Johannes Hartmann
 Hartree energy – Douglas Hartree
 Hasse's algorithm – see Collatz conjecture, above
 Hasse diagram, principle – Helmut Hasse
 Hasse–Minkowski theorem – Helmut Hasse and Hermann Minkowski
 Hausdorff dimension – Felix Hausdorff
 Hawthorne effect – from the Hawthorne Works factory (where experiments were carried out 1924–1932)
 Hayashi track – Chushiro Hayashi
 Hayflick limit – Leonard Hayflick
 Hawking radiation (a.k.a. Bekenstein–Hawking radiation) – Stephen Hawking (and Jacob Bekenstein)
 Heaviside layer – see Kennelly–Heaviside layer
 Hebbian learning – Donald Olding Hebb
 Heine–Borel theorem – Heinrich Eduard Heine and Émile Borel
 Heinlein's razor – see Hanlon's razor, above
 Heisenberg uncertainty principle – Werner Heisenberg
 Hellmann–Feynman theorem – Hans Hellmann and Richard Feynman
 Helmholtz free energy, Helmholtz resonance – Hermann von Helmholtz
 Hénon map – Michel Hénon
 Hénon–Heiles system, potential – Michel Hénon and Carl E. Heiles
 Henrietta's law – see Leavitt's law, below
 Henyey track – Louis G. Henyey
 Herbig Ae/Be star – George Herbig
 Herbig–Haro object – George Herbig and Guillermo Haro
 Herbrand base, interpretation, structure, universe, and Herbrand's theorem – Jacques Herbrand
 Hertz effect – Heinrich Rudolf Hertz
 Hertzsprung–Russell diagram – Ejnar Hertzsprung and Henry Norris Russell
 Hess afterimage – Carl von Hess
 Hess diagram – R. Hess
 Heusler alloy – Fritz Heusler
 Heyting algebra, arithmetic – Arend Heyting
 Hick's law, a.k.a. Hick–Hyman law – William Edmund Hick and Ray Hyman
 Higgs boson, field – Peter Higgs
 Higgs mechanism – see Anderson–Higgs mechanism, above
 Hilbert–Waring theorem (a.k.a. Waring's problem) – David Hilbert and Edward Waring
 Hill sphere (a.k.a. Roche sphere) – George William Hill (and Édouard Roche)
 Hills cloud – Jack G. Hills
 Hipparchic cycle – Hipparchus of Nicaea (a.k.a. Hipparchus of Rhodes)
 Hirayama family – Kiyotsugu Hirayama
 Hirsch–Meeks fusor – Robert L. Hirsch and Gene A. Meeks
 Hofstadter's butterfly, law – Douglas Hofstadter
 Hopfield network – John J. Hopfield
 Hořava–Lifshitz gravity – Petr Hořava and Evgeny Lifshitz
 Hořava–Witten domain wall – Petr Hořava and Edward Witten
 Hubbert peak – Marion King Hubbert
 Hubble constant, expansion – Edwin Hubble
 Hubble–Reynolds law – Edwin Hubble and John Henry Reynolds
 Huchra's Lens – John Huchra
 Humphreys line/series – Curtis J. Humphreys
 Hund's Rules – Friedrich Hund
 Hunsdiecker reaction – Heinz Hunsdiecker and Cläre Hunsdiecker
 Huygens–Fresnel principle – Christiaan Huygens and Augustin-Jean Fresnel

I

 Imbert–Fedorov effect – Christian Imbert and Fedor Ivanovič Fedorov
 Ishikawa diagram – Kaoru Ishikawa
 Ising model (a.k.a. Lenz–Ising model) – Ernst Ising (and Wilhelm Lenz)

J

 Jaccard index, similarity coefficient, distance – Paul Jaccard
 Jaffe profile (or model) – Walter Jaffe
 Jahn–Teller effect – Hermann Arthur Jahn and Edward Teller
 Jaro–Winkler distance – Matthew A. Jaro and William E. Winkler
 Jarque–Bera test – Carlos M. Jarque and Anil K. Bera
 Jeans's theorem – James Hopwood Jeans
 Johnson–Nyquist noise – John B. Johnson and Harry Nyquist
 Jordan's rule/law – David Starr Jordan
 Josephson constant, effect, junction – Brian David Josephson
 Joule's law (a.k.a. Joule–Lenz law) – James Prescott Joule and Heinrich Friedrich Emil Lenz
 Joule–Thomson effect (a.k.a. Joule–Kelvin effect) – James Prescott Joule and William Thomson, 1st Baron Kelvin

K
 K3 surface – Ernst Kummer, Erich Kähler, Kunihiko Kodaira
 Kähler differential, manifold, metric – Erich Kähler
 Kakutani's problem – see Collatz conjecture, above
 Kármán vortex street – Theodore von Kármán
 Karnaugh map (a.k.a. Karnaugh–Veitch map, Veitch diagram) – Maurice Karnaugh (and Edward W. Veitch)
 Karush–Kuhn–Tucker conditions (a.k.a. Kuhn–Tucker conditions) – William Karush, Harold W. Kuhn and Albert W. Tucker
 Kasha's rule – Michael Kasha
 Kater's pendulum – Captain Henry Kater
 Kaye effect – Alan Kaye
 Keeling curve – Charles David Keeling
 Kelvin wave – William Thomson, 1st Baron Kelvin
 Kelvin–Helmholtz mechanism, instability – William Thomson, 1st Baron Kelvin and Hermann von Helmholtz
 Kelvin–Joule effect (a.k.a. Joule–Thomson effect) – William Thomson, 1st Baron Kelvin and James Prescott Joule
 Kelvin–Voigt material, model – Woldemar Voigt and William Thomson, 1st Baron Kelvin
 Kennelly–Heaviside layer – Arthur Edwin Kennelly and Oliver Heaviside
 Kennicutt–Schmidt law (a.k.a. Schmidt–Kennicutt law, or Schmidt law) – Maarten Schmidt and Robert Kennicutt
 Kepler's laws of planetary motion – Johannes Kepler
 Kerr effect – John Kerr
 Kirkendall effect – Ernest Kirkendall
 Kleene star (a.k.a. Kleene operator, Kleene closure) – Stephen Kleene
 Klein–Gordon equation – Oskar Klein and Walter Gordon
 Klein–Nishina effect – Oskar Klein and Yoshio Nishina
 Knudsen cell, number – Martin Hans Christian Knudsen
 Kodaira dimension, embedding theorem, vanishing theorem – Kunihiko Kodaira
 Koenigs–Knorr reaction – Wilhelm Koenigs and Edward Knorr
 Kohn effect – Walter Kohn
 Kohn–Sham equations – Walter Kohn and Lu Jeu Sham
 Kohonen network – Teuvo Kohonen
 Kolakoski sequence – William Kolakoski
 Kolbe electrolysis – Adolph Wilhelm Hermann Kolbe
 Kolbe–Schmitt reaction – Adolph Wilhelm Hermann Kolbe and Rudolf Schmitt
 Kondo effect – Jun Kondo
 Kornblum oxidation – Nathan Kornblum
 Kornblum–DeLaMare rearrangement – Nathan Kornblum and Harold E. DeLaMare
 Kossel effect – Walther Kossel
 Kosterlitz–Thouless transition – see Berezinsky–Kosterlitz–Thouless transition, above
 Kozai effect – Yoshihide Kozai
 Krebs cycle – Hans Adolf Krebs
 Kratzer potential – Adolf Kratzer
 Kronecker delta – Leopold Kronecker
 Kuhn–Tucker conditions – see Karush–Kuhn–Tucker conditions, above
 Kuiper belt – Gerard Kuiper
 Kummer's function, Kummer surface – Ernst Kummer
 Kuramoto model – Yoshiki Kuramoto

L
 Lagrangian mechanics, Lagrange points – Joseph-Louis Lagrange
 Lamb shift – Willis Lamb
 Lambert's cosine law (a.k.a. Lambert's emission law) – Johann Heinrich Lambert
 Landau damping, pole – Lev Davidovich Landau
 Landau–Pomeranchuk–Migdal effect – Lev Davidovich Landau, Isaak Pomeranchuk, and Arkady Migdal
 Landau–Zener transition – Lev Davidovich Landau and Clarence Zener
 Landé g-factor – Alfred Landé
 Langmuir probe – Irving Langmuir
 Langmuir–Blodgett film – Irving Langmuir and Katharine B. Blodgett
 Laplace vector – see Laplace–Runge–Lenz vector, below
 Laplace–Runge–Lenz vector (a.k.a. LRL vector, Laplace vector, Runge–Lenz vector, Lenz vector) – Pierre-Simon de Laplace, Carl Runge and Wilhelm Lenz
 Larmor frequency, precession, radius – Joseph Larmor
 Larsen effect – Søren Absalon Larsen
 Laspeyres index – Ernst Louis Etienne Laspeyres
 Leavitt's law (a.k.a. Henrietta's law) – Henrietta Swan Leavitt
 Le Chatelier's principle – Henri Louis Le Chatelier
 Lee distance – C. Y. Lee
 Leidenfrost effect, point – Johann Gottlob Leidenfrost
 Lenard effect – Philipp Eduard Anton von Lenard
 Lennard-Jones potential – John Lennard-Jones
 Lense–Thirring effect (a.k.a. Thirring effect) – Josef Lense and Hans Thirring
 Lenz vector – see Laplace–Runge–Lenz vector, above
 Lenz's law – Heinrich Friedrich Emil Lenz
 Leonard–Merritt mass estimator – Peter Leonard and David Merritt
 Levenshtein distance, automaton – Vladimir Levenshtein
 Levi-Civita symbol – Tullio Levi-Civita
 Lewis–Mogridge Position – David Lewis and Martin J. H. Mogridge
 Little–Parks effect – William A. Little and Roland D. Parks
 Littlewood–Offord problem – John E. Littlewood and A. Cyril Offord
 Locard's exchange principle – Edmond Locard
 Lombard effect – Étienne Lombard
 London force – Fritz London
 Lorentz force, transformation – Hendrik Antoon Lorentz
 Lorentz–Lorenz equation – Hendrik Antoon Lorentz and Ludvig Lorenz
 Lorenz attractor – Edward Norton Lorenz
 Lorenz curve – Max O. Lorenz
 Lorenz gauge condition – Ludvig Lorenz
 Lorenz–Mie scattering – see Mie scattering, below
 Loschmidt's paradox – Johann Josef Loschmidt
 Lotka's law – Alfred J. Lotka
 Lotka–Volterra equation – Alfred J. Lotka and Vito Volterra
 Love waves – Augustus Edward Hough Love
 Lucas critique – Robert Lucas, Jr.
 Lyapunov's central limit theorem, equation, exponent, fractal, function, stability, test, time and tube – Aleksandr Mikhailovich Lyapunov
 Lyman line, series – Theodore Lyman

M
 Mach band/effect, number, principle – Ernst Mach
 Mach–Zehnder interferometer – Ludwig Mach and Ludwig Zehnder
 Madelung constant – Erwin Madelung
 Madelung rule – Erwin Madelung
 Maggi–Righi–Leduc effect (Thermal Hall effect) – Gian Antonio Maggi, Augusto Righi and Sylvestre Anatole Leduc
 Magnus effect – Heinrich Gustav Magnus
 Mahalanobis distance – Prasanta Chandra Mahalanobis (প্রশান্ত চন্দ্র মহলানবিস)
 Mahler measure, Mahler's theorem – Kurt Mahler
 Malmquist bias, effect – Karl Gunnar Malmquist
 Malus's law – Étienne-Louis Malus
 Malthusian parameter – named by Ronald Fisher as a criticism of Thomas Robert Malthus
 Malthusian catastrophe, growth model – Thomas Robert Malthus
 Marangoni cell/convection (a.k.a. Bénard–Marangoni convection) – see Bénard–Marangoni cell/convection, above
 Marangoni effect (a.k.a. Gibbs–Marangoni effect) – see Gibbs–Marangoni effect, above
 Markov's inequality, chain, partition, Markovian process – Andrey Markov
 Mathieu functions – Émile Léonard Mathieu
 Matilda effect – Matilda Joslyn Gage
 Matthew effect – Matthew the Evangelist
 Maxwell–Boltzmann distribution – James Clerk Maxwell and Ludwig Boltzmann
 McCollough effect – Celeste McCollough
 McCulloch–Pitts neuron – Warren McCulloch and Walter Pitts
 McGurk effect (a.k.a. McGurk–MacDonald effect) – Harry McGurk (and John MacDonald)
 Mealy machine – George H. Mealy
 Meissner effect (a.k.a. Meissner–Ochsenfeld effect) – Walther Meissner (and Robert Ochsenfeld)
 Mendelian inheritance – Gregor Mendel
 Mercalli intensity scale (Modified Mercalli scale) – Giuseppe Mercalli
 Metonic cycle – Meton of Athens
 Meyers synthesis – Albert I. Meyers
 Mie scattering (a.k.a. Lorenz–Mie scattering) – Gustav Mie (and Ludvig Lorenz)
 Mihăilescu's theorem (a.k.a. Catalan's conjecture) – Preda Mihăilescu
 Mikheyev–Smirnov–Wolfenstein effect – Stanislav Mikheyev, Alexei Smirnov, and Lincoln Wolfenstein
 Miller effect – John Milton Miller 
 Miller indices (a.k.a. Miller–Bravais indices) – William Hallowes Miller (and Auguste Bravais)
 Misznay–Schardin effect – Col. Misznay and Hubert Schardin
 Mögel–Dellinger effect – see Dellinger effect, above
 Mohorovičić discontinuity (Moho) – Andrija Mohorovičić
 Mohr's circle – Christian Otto Mohr
 Mohr–Coulomb theory – Christian Otto Mohr and Charles-Augustin de Coulomb
 Mooers's law – Calvin Mooers
 Moore machine – Edward Forrest Moore
 Moore's law – Gordon E. Moore
 Morgan unit – Thomas Hunt Morgan
 Moreton wave – Gail E. Moreton
 Morse potential – Philip M. Morse
 Mössbauer effect – Rudolf Mössbauer
 Mott cross section, Mott insulator, Mott transition – Nevill Francis Mott
 Mpemba effect – Erasto B. Mpemba
 Müllerian mimicry – Fritz Müller
 Munroe effect – Charles Edward Munroe
 Murphy's law – Maj. Edward A. Murphy, Jr.

N
 Nambu–Goldstone boson (a.k.a. Goldstone boson) – Yoichiro Nambu and Jeffrey Goldstone
 Nash equilibrium – John Forbes Nash
 Nassi–Shneiderman diagram – Isaac Nassi and Ben Shneiderman
 Necker cube – Louis Albert Necker
 Needleman–Wunsch algorithm – Saul B. Needleman and Christian D. Wunsch
 Néel temperature – Louis Néel
 Nernst effect (a.k.a. Nernst–Ettingshausen effect) – Walther Hermann Nernst and Albert von Ettingshausen
 Nernst equation – Walther Hermann Nernst
 Neupert effect – Werner Neupert
 Newcomb's paradox – William Newcomb
 Newton's rings, Newtonian constant, mechanics – Isaac Newton
 Noether's theorem – Emmy Noether
 Nordtvedt effect – Kenneth L. Nordtvedt
 Nyquist frequency, Nyquist rate – Harry Nyquist
 Nyquist–Shannon sampling theorem (a.k.a. Nyquist–Shannon–Kotelnikov, Whittaker–Shannon–Kotelnikov, Whittaker–Nyquist–Kotelnikov–Shannon, WKS theorem) – Harry Nyquist, Claude Shannon, Edmund Taylor Whittaker, and Vladimir Kotelnikov

O
 Oberth effect – Hermann Oberth
 O'Connell effect – Daniel Joseph Kelly O'Connell
 Olbers's paradox – Heinrich Wilhelm Olbers
 Ohm's law – Georg Ohm
 Okun's law – Arthur Okun
 Omori's law – Fusakichi Omori
 Onnes effect – Heike Kamerlingh Onnes
 Oort cloud (a.k.a. Öpik–Oort cloud) – Jan Hendrik Oort (and Ernst Julius Öpik)
 Ostriker–Peebles criterion – Jeremiah P. Ostriker and Jim Peebles
 Ostwald's dilution law, Ostwald process – Friedrich Wilhelm Ostwald
 Overhauser effect – Albert Overhauser
 Ovshinsky effect – Stanford R. Ovshinsky

P
 Paal–Knorr synthesis – Carl Paal and Ludwig Knorr
 Pareto chart, distribution, efficiency, index, principle – Vilfredo Federico Damaso Pareto
 Pareto–Zipf law (a.k.a. Zipf–Mandelbrot law) – Vilfredo Pareto and George K. Zipf (or Benoît Mandelbrot)
 Parrondo's games, paradox – Juan Manuel Rodríguez Parrondo
 Paschen curve, line, law – Friedrich Paschen
 Paschen–Back effect – Friedrich Paschen and Ernst Back
 Pasteur effect – Louis Pasteur
 Paternò–Büchi reaction – Emanuele Paternò and George Büchi
 Pauli exclusion principle – Wolfgang Pauli
 Peano curve – Giuseppe Peano
 Pearson–Anson effect – Stephen Oswald Pearson and Horatio Saint George Anson
 Péclet number – Jean Claude Eugène Péclet
 Peltier effect – Jean Charles Athanase Peltier
 Perlin noise – Ken Perlin
 Perron–Frobenius theorem – Oskar Perron, and Ferdinand Georg Frobenius
 Petkau effect – Abram Petkau
 Petri dish – Julius Richard Petri
 Petri net – Carl Adam Petri
 Peyer's patches – Johann Conrad Peyer
 Pfeiffer effect – Paul Pfeiffer
 Pfund line/series – August Herman Pfund
 Phillips curve – William Phillips (economist)
 Pigou effect – Arthur Cecil Pigou
 Pisot–Vijayaraghavan number – Charles Pisot and Tirukkannapuram Vijayaraghavan
 Planck constant, length, mass, time – Max Planck
 Platonic year – Plato
 Pockels effect – Friedrich Carl Alwin Pockels
 Pogson ratio – Norman Robert Pogson
 Poincaré map, section – Henri Poincaré
 Poincaré–Bendixson theorem – Henri Poincaré and Ivar Otto Bendixson
 Poinsot's spirals – Louis Poinsot
 Polchinski's paradox – Joseph Polchinski
 Potts model (a.k.a. Ashkin–Teller model) – Renfrey B. Potts, Julius Ashkin, and Edward Teller
 Pourbaix diagram – Marcel Pourbaix
 Poynting effect, vector – John Henry Poynting
 Poynting–Robertson effect – John Henry Poynting and Howard P. Robertson
 Prandtl number – Ludwig Prandtl
 Primakoff effect – Henry Primakoff
 Proteus phenomenon – Proteus (mythological god)
 Pulfrich effect – Carl P. Pulfrich
 Purkinje effect/shift – Johannes Evangelista Purkinje
 Pygmalion effect (a.k.a. Rosenthal effect, observer-expectancy effect) – Pygmalion (and Robert Rosenthal)
 Pythagorean theorem (a.k.a. Pythagoras's theorem) – Pythagoras

R
 Rabi oscillations – Isidor Isaac Rabi
 Rademacher distribution, function, series, sum – Hans Adolph Rademacher
 Rademacher–Menchov theorem – Hans Adolph Rademacher and Dmitrii Menshov
 Raman scattering – Chandrasekhara Venkata Raman
 Ramsauer–Townsend effect (a.k.a. Ramsauer effect, Townsend effect) – Carl Ramsauer and John Sealy Townsend
 Ramsden circle/disc/eyepoint, eyepiece – Jesse Ramsden
 Ramsey theory – Frank Plumpton Ramsey
 Rapoport's rule – Eduardo H. Rapoport
 Raychaudhuri's equation – Amal Kumar Raychaudhuri (অমল কুমার রায়চৌধুরী)
 Raygor Estimate Graph – Alton L. Raygor
 Rayleigh criterion, distribution, fading, number, quotient, scattering, waves – Lord Rayleigh
 Rayleigh–Bénard cell/convection – Lord Rayleigh and Henri Bénard
 Rayleigh–Jeans law – Lord Rayleigh and James Jeans
 Rayleigh–Taylor instability – Lord Rayleigh and G. I. Taylor
 Rees–Sciama effect – Martin Rees and Dennis Sciama
 Reidemeister moves – Kurt Reidemeister
 Rescorla–Wagner rule – Robert A. Rescorla and Allan R. Wagner
 Reynolds number, Reynolds analogy – Osborne Reynolds
 Ribot's law (of Retrograde Amnesia) – Théodule-Armand Ribot
 Ricardian equivalence (a.k.a. Barro–Ricardo equivalence, or Ricardo–de Viti–Barro equivalence) – Robert Barro, David Ricardo, and Antonio de Viti de Marco
 Richards controller – Charles L. Richards
 Richardson's constant, equation, law – Owen Willans Richardson
 Richardson number – Lewis Fry Richardson
 Richter magnitude scale – Charles Francis Richter
 Righi–Leduc effect (a.k.a. Leduc–Righi effect) – Augusto Righi and Sylvestre Anatole Leduc
 Ringelmann effect – Max Ringelmann
 Robertson–Walker metric (a.k.a. Friedmann–Robertson–Walker metric) – see Friedmann–Lemaître–Robertson–Walker metric, above
 Roche limit – Édouard Roche
 Roche sphere (a.k.a. Hill sphere) – Édouard Roche (and George William Hill)
 Rollin film – Bernard V. Rollin
 Rosenthal effect (a.k.a. Pygmalion effect, observer-expectancy effect) – Robert Rosenthal (and Pygmalion)
 Rossby waves – Carl-Gustaf Arvid Rossby
 Rossi–Forel scale – Michele Stefano Conte de Rossi and François-Alphonse Forel
 Rössler equation – Otto Rössler
 Rossmann fold – Michael Rossmann
 Royer oscillator – George H. Royer
 Ruelle operator, zeta function – David Ruelle
 Ruelle–Perron–Frobenius theorem – David Ruelle, Oskar Perron, and Ferdinand Georg Frobenius
 Ruhmkorff coil – Heinrich D. Ruhmkorff
 Runge–Lenz vector – see Laplace–Runge–Lenz vector
 Runge's phenomenon – Carle David Tolmé Runge
 Russell's paradox – Bertrand Russell
 Rutherford experiment (a.k.a. Geiger–Marsden experiment), scattering – Ernest Rutherford
 Rybczynski theorem – Tadeusz Rybczynski
 Rydberg constant, formula – Johannes Rydberg
 Rydberg–Klein–Rees method – Johannes Rydberg, Oskar Klein, and Albert Lloyd George Rees

S
 Sabatier or Sabattier effect – Sabat[t]ier, first name unknown
 Sachs–Wolfe effect – Rainer K. Sachs and Arthur M. Wolfe
 Saffir–Simpson hurricane wind scale – Herbert S. Saffir and Robert ("Bob") Simpson
 Sagnac effect – Georges Sagnac
 Saha ionization equation (a.k.a. Saha–Langmuir equation) – Megh Nad Saha (মেঘনাদ সাহা) (and Irving Langmuir)
 St. Elmo's fire – Erasmus of Formiae
 Salem number – Raphaël Salem
 Sapir–Whorf hypothesis – Edward Sapir and Benjamin Whorf
 Sasakian manifold, metric – Shigeo Sasaki
 Say's law – Jean-Baptiste Say
 Scheerer's phenomenon (Blue field entoptic phenomenon) – Richard Scheerer
 Schering Bridge – Harald Schering
 Schild plot, regression analysis – Heinz Otto Schild
 Schmidt law, Schmidt–Kennicutt law – see Kennicutt–Schmidt law, above
 Schottky effect – Walter H. Schottky
 Schröter effect – Johann Hieronymus Schröter
 Schülen–Wilson effect – see Wilson effect, below
 Schuler period, tuning – Maximilian Schuler
 Schultz's rule – Adolph Hans Schultz
 Schumann–Runge bands – Victor Schumann and Carle David Tolmé Runge
 Schwabe solar cycle – Samuel Heinrich Schwabe
 Schwarzschild effect, metric, radius – Karl Schwarzschild
 Scott effect – Elizabeth L. Scott
 Secchi (stellar) class, depth, disk – Pietro Angelo Secchi
 Seebeck effect – Thomas Johann Seebeck
 Seiberg–Witten gauge theory – Nathan Seiberg and Edward Witten
 Seiberg–Witten invariant – Nathan Seiberg and Edward Witten
 Senftleben–Beenakker effect – Hermann Senftleben and Jan J. M. Beenakker
 Sertoli cells – Enrico Sertoli
 Serre duality – Jean-Pierre Serre
 Seyfert galaxy – Carl Keenan Seyfert
 Shapiro effect – Irwin Shapiro
 Shimizu–Morioka attractor, equations – Tatsujiro Shimizu and Nozomi Morioka
 Shubnikov–de Haas effect – Wander Johannes de Haas and Lev Vasiljevich Shubnikov
 Sieberg tsunami intensity scale – August Heinrich Sieberg
 Sieberg–Ambraseys tsunami intensity scale – August Heinrich Sieberg and Nicholas Ambraseys
 Simmons–Smith reaction – Howard Ensign Simmons, Jr.
 Simpson's paradox (a.k.a. Yule–Simpson effect) – Edward H. Simpson (and Udny Yule)
 Simroth's organs – Heinrich Rudolf Simroth
 Smale's horseshoe – Stephen Smale
 Smale–Rössler theorem – Stephen Smale and Otto Rössler
 Smith–Waterman algorithm – Temple F. Smith and Michael S. Waterman
 Snell's law – Willebrord van Roijen Snell
 Soloviev tsunami intensity scale – Sergey L. Soloviev
 Sommerfeld–Kossel displacement law – Arnold Sommerfeld and Walther Kossel
 Sørensen similarity index, similarity coefficient – Thorvald Sørensen
 Spörer's law, Spörer Minimum – Gustav Spörer
 Staebler–Wronski effect – David L. Staebler and Christopher R. Wronski
 Stark effect (a.k.a. Stark–Lo Surdo effect) – Johannes Stark (and Antonino Lo Surdo)
 Stark ladder (a.k.a. Wannier–Stark ladder, q.v.) – Johannes Stark and Gregory Hugh Wannier
 Stark–Einstein law – Johannes Stark and Albert Einstein
 Stebbins–Whitford effect – Joel Stebbins and Albert Edward Whitford
 Stefan's constant, law (a.k.a. Stefan–Boltzmann constant, law) – Jožef Stefan (and Ludwig Boltzmann)
 Stensen's duct – Niels Stensen
 Stern–Levison parameter – S. Alan Stern and Harold F. Levison
 Stevens effect – Joseph C. and Stanley Smith Stevens
 Stevens's power law – Stanley Smith Stevens
 Stewart's organs – Charles Stewart
 Stewart–Tolman effect – Thomas Dale Stewart and Richard Chace Tolman
 Stigler's law of eponymy – Stephen Stigler
 Stirling number – James Stirling
 Stokes radius – George Gabriel Stokes
 Stokes shift – George Gabriel Stokes
 Stolper–Samuelson theorem – Paul Samuelson and Wolfgang Stolper
 Strömgren age, photometry, sphere – Bengt Georg Daniel Strömgren
 Strömgren–Crawford photometry – Bengt Georg Daniel Strömgren and David L. Crawford
 Stroop effect – John Ridley Stroop
 Strouhal number – Vincenc Strouhal
 Stueckelberg action – Ernst Carl Gerlach Stueckelberg
 Sturgeon's law – Theodore Sturgeon
 Sturmian trajectories – Charles François Sturm
 Suess effect – Hans Eduard Suess
 Suess solar cycle, DeVries solar cycle, Suess-DeVries solar cycle – Hans Eduard Suess and Hessel de Vries
 Sunyaev–Zel'dovich effect – Rashid Sunyaev and Yakov Zel'dovich
 Syracuse problem – see Collatz conjecture, above
 Szilard–Chalmers effect – Leó Szilárd and Thomas A. Chalmers

T
 Tait–Bryan angles (a.k.a. Cardan angles, nautical angles) – Peter Guthrie Tait and George H. Bryan
 Talbot effect – William Henry Fox Talbot
 Tanimoto coefficient, distance, measure, score, similarity – Taffee T. Tanimoto
 Taylor cone – Geoffrey Ingram Taylor
 Taylor-Couette flow – Geoffrey Ingram Taylor and Maurice Marie Alfred Couette 
 Teller–Ulam design – Edward Teller and Stanislaw Ulam
 Thévenin's theorem – Léon Charles Thévenin
 Thirring effect – see Lense–Thirring effect, above
 Thomas precession – Llewellyn Thomas
 Thomas–Fermi approximation, model – Llewellyn Hilleth Thomas and Enrico Fermi
 Thomson cross-section, effect – William Thomson, 1st Baron Kelvin
 Thomson structure (a.k.a. Widmanstätten pattern) – William (Guglielmo) Thomson (or Count Alois von Beckh Widmanstätten)
 Thorndike's laws (of effect, readiness, and exercise) – Edward L. Thorndike
 Thorson's rule – Gunnar Thorson
 Thouless energy – David J. Thouless
 Thwaites conjecture – see Collatz conjecture, above
 Tiedemann's bodies – Friedrich Tiedemann
 Tiffeneau–Demjanov rearrangement – Marc Tiffeneau and Nikolai Demyanov
 Tobin's q – James Tobin
 Tolman effects – Richard Chace Tolman
 Tolman–Oppenheimer–Volkoff limit – Richard Chace Tolman, J. Robert Oppenheimer, and George Michael Volkoff
 Tonks–Girardeau gas – Lewi Tonks and Marvin D. Girardeau
 Townsend effect (a.k.a. Ramsauer effect, Ramsauer–Townsend effect), ionization coefficient – John Sealy Townsend
 Troxler's effect/fading – Ignaz Paul Vital Troxler
 Tychonoff space – Andrey Nikolayevich Tychonoff
 Tyndall effect/scattering – John Tyndall

U
 Ulam conjecture – see Collatz conjecture
 Ulam's packing conjecture – Stanislaw Ulam
 Unruh effect – William G. Unruh

V
 Vackář oscillator  – Jirí Vackář 
 Van Allen radiation belt – James Van Allen
 Van de Graaff generator – Dr. Robert Jemison Van de Graaff
 Van der Pol equation, oscillator – Balthasar van der Pol
 Van der Waals force – Johannes Diderik van der Waals
 Van Hove singularity – Léon Van Hove
 Vavilovian mimicry – Nikolai Ivanovich Vavilov
 Veblen effect – Thorstein Veblen
 Veitch diagram – see Karnaugh map, above
 Venturi effect – Giovanni Battista Venturi
 Venn diagram – John Venn
 Vierordt's law – Karl von Vierordt
 Vogel-Fulcher-Tammann equation – Hans Vogel, Gordon Scott Fulcher, and Gustav Tammann
 Vogt–Russell theorem – Heinrich Vogt and Henry Norris Russell
 Voigt effect, notation, profile – Woldemar Voigt
 Voigt material – see Kelvin–Voigt material, above
 Von Klitzing constant – Klaus von Klitzing
 Von Neumann ordinal, von Neumann architecture – John von Neumann
 Von Restorff effect – Hedwig von Restorff
 Von Zeipel theorem – Edvard Hugo von Zeipel

W
 Wadati–Benioff zone (a.k.a. Benioff zone) – Kiyoo Wadati and Hugo Benioff
 Wahlund effect – Sten Gösta William Wahlund
 Wallace's line – Alfred Russel Wallace
 Walras's law – Léon Walras
 Wannier function, orbital – Gregory Wannier
 Wasserman 9-Panel Plot – Karlman Wasserman
 Wannier–Stark ladder (a.k.a. Stark ladder) – Gregory Wannier and Johannes Stark
 Warburg effect – Otto Warburg
 Waring's problem (a.k.a. Hilbert–Waring theorem) – Edward Waring (and David Hilbert)
 Weber–Fechner law (Weber's law, Fechner's law) – Ernst Heinrich Weber and Gustav Theodor Fechner
 Weberian apparatus – Ernst Heinrich Weber
 Weierstrass–Casorati theorem – Karl Theodor Wilhelm Weierstrass and Felice Casorati
 Weierstrass's elliptic functions, factorization theorem, function, M-test, preparation theorem – Karl Theodor Wilhelm Weierstrass
 Wien bridge – Max Wien
 Weissenberg effect – Karl Weissenberg
 Wess–Zumino–Witten model – Julius Wess, Bruno Zumino and Edward Witten
 Wess–Zumino model – Julius Wess, Bruno Zumino
 Westermarck effect – Edvard Westermarck
 Weston cell – Edward Weston
 Wheatstone bridge – Charles Wheatstone (improved and popularized it; the inventor was Samuel Hunter Christie)
 Whittaker function, Whittaker integral, Whittaker model – Edmund Taylor Whittaker
 Whittaker–Shannon interpolation formula – Edmund Taylor Whittaker, John Macnaghten Whittaker, Claude Shannon
 Widmanstätten pattern (a.k.a. Thomson structure) – Count Alois von Beckh Widmanstätten (or William (Guglielmo) Thomson)
 Widom line – Benjamin Widom
 Widrow–Hoff least mean squares filter – Bernard Widrow and Ted Hoff
 Wiedemann–Franz law – Gustav Wiedemann and Rudolf Franz
 Wiegand effect – John R. Wiegand
 Wien bridge (Wien's bridge), constant, effect, law – Wilhelm Wien
 Wiener filter, process – Norbert Wiener
 Wigmore chart – John Henry Wigmore
 Wigner energy, Wigner effect – Eugene Wigner
 Wigner–Seitz cell – Eugene Wigner and Frederick Seitz
 Wilson cycle – John Tuzo Wilson
 Wilson effect – Alexander Wilson
 Wilson–Bappu effect – Olin Chaddock Wilson and Manali Kallat Vainu Bappu
 Witten index – Edward Witten
 Wollaston prism – William Hyde Wollaston
 Woodward–Hoffmann rules – Robert Burns Woodward and Roald Hoffmann
 Wolf effect – Emil Wolf
 Wulf bands – Oliver R. Wulf
 Wulff–Dötz reaction – William Wulff and Karl Heinz Dötz

Y
 Yarkovsky effect – Ivan Osipovich Yarkovsky
 YORP effect – Ivan Osipovich Yarkovsky, John A. O'Keefe, Vladimir Vyacheslavovich Radzievskii, and Stephen J. Paddack
 Young diagram (a.k.a. Ferrers diagram), Young tableau – Alfred Young
 Young's modulus – Thomas Young
 Yule–Simpson effect (a.k.a. Simpson's paradox) – Edward H. Simpson and Udny Yule

Z
 Zeeman effect – Pieter Zeeman
 Zeigarnik effect – Bluma Zeigarnik
 Zener effect – Clarence Melvin Zener
 Zeno effect – Zeno of Elea
 Zipf's law – George K. Zipf
 Zipf–Mandelbrot law (a.k.a. Pareto–Zipf law) – George K. Zipf and Benoît Mandelbrot (or Vilfredo Pareto)

See also
 Eponyms
 Fields of science
 List of eponymous laws
 List of eponymous medical signs
 List of scientists
 Lists of etymologies
 List of eponymous diseases
 List of fluid flows named after people
 List of hydrodynamic instabilities named after people
 List of waves named after people
 Scientific constants named after people
 Scientific laws named after people

References

Lists of eponyms
Science-related lists
Lists of things named after scientists